The 2015 Arab Under 17 Women's Cup is the 1st edition of the Arab U-17 Women's Cup for national women's football teams for under 17 affiliated with the Union of Arab Football Associations (UAFA). The tournament was hosted by Qatar between 15 and 23 February 2015. The winner was Lebanon team, marked for the first time Lebanon won a major tournament.

Participating teams

 

 (hosts)

Venues

Match officials
The following referees were chosen for the 2015 Africa Cup of Nations.

Referees
  Sarah Samir Mohammed
  Huda Al-Awadhi
  Insaf Harkaoui
  Mounia Badawi
  Dorsaf Kenwati
  Rana Rabie Al-Mesmary

Assistant referees
  Hanadi Hasan Mahmoud
  Muna Mahmoud Atallah
  Zohra Jalal
  Karima Khadri
  Souad Oulhaj
  Amel Hachad

Group stage

Group A

Group B

Knockout phase
The semi-final winners proceed to the final and those who lost compete in the third place playoff.

Semi-finals

Third place match

Final

Statistics

Goalscorers
8 goals
  Rozine Nidal

4 goals
  Mazer Fouad

3 goals
  Hala Ghalaini
  Aya Al Jurdi
  Ahlem Abid

2 goals

  Nihad Moudjer
  Kafia Abdulrahmane
  Mariam Chehab

1 goal

  Bouchra Achoub
  Amira Chemain
  Ferial Dhaoui
  Mélissa Djernine
  Kahina Ourbah
  Fatima Ali
  Yara Matar Hosry
  Hanin Tamim
  Gabrielle Cherfane
  Bahia Samih

Team statistics

|-
|colspan="10"|Eliminated in the group stage
|-

References

External links
 كأس العرب للفتيات تحت 17 سنة 2015 - UAFA official website

Arab U-17 Women's Cup
2015 in women's association football
2014–15 in Qatari football
2015 in youth sport
2015 in youth association football